Metasia rosealis is a species of moth in the family Crambidae. It is found in Greece, on Cyprus,  as well as in the Near East, including Turkey, Lebanon and Syria.

References

Moths described in 1895
Metasia
Moths of Europe
Moths of Asia